Lopukhovka is a rural locality (a selo) and the administrative center of Lopukhovskoye Rural Settlement, Rudnyansky District, Volgograd Oblast, Russia. The population was 939 as of 2010. There are 5 streets.

Geography 
Lopukhovka is located 30 km southwest of Rudnya (the district's administrative centre) by road. Ushinka is the nearest rural locality.

References 

Rural localities in Rudnyansky District, Volgograd Oblast
Kamyshinsky Uyezd